The 2019 BOOST National was held from December 10 to 15, at the Conception Bay South Arena in Conception Bay South, Newfoundland and Labrador. It was the third Grand Slam and second major of the 2019–20 season.

In the men's final, Team Brad Jacobs defeated Team Niklas Edin 3–1 to win their second consecutive Grand Slam event. In the women's final, Team Anna Hasselborg also won their second consecutive Grand Slam event, defeating Team Jennifer Jones 7–3.

Qualification
The top 14 men's and women's teams on the World Curling Tour order of merit standings as of November 5, 2019 qualified for the event. The Grand Slam of Curling may fill one spot in each division as a sponsor's exemption. In the event that a team declines their invitation, the next-ranked team on the order of merit is invited until the field is complete. The sponsor's exemption was not used, and the spot was allocated to the highest-ranked remaining team on the order of merit. The teams were seeded in pools per the rankings on November 19, 2019

Men
Top Order of Merit men's teams as of November 5:
 John Epping
 Kevin Koe
 Brad Jacobs
 Bruce Mouat
 Peter de Cruz
 Brendan Bottcher
 Ross Paterson
 Niklas Edin
 Brad Gushue
 Matt Dunstone
 Yannick Schwaller
 Mike McEwen
 Scott McDonald
 Glenn Howard
 Yuta Matsumura

Women
Top Order of Merit women's teams as of November 5:
 Kerri Einarson
 Silvana Tirinzoni
 Rachel Homan
 Anna Hasselborg
 Tracy Fleury
 Jennifer Jones
 Satsuki Fujisawa
 Chelsea Carey
 Elena Stern
 Sayaka Yoshimura
 Eve Muirhead
 Casey Scheidegger
 Isabella Wranå
 Kelsey Rocque
 Robyn Silvernagle

Men

Teams

The teams are listed as follows:

Round-robin standings
Final round-robin standings

Round-robin results
All draw times are listed in Newfoundland Time (UTC−03:30).

Draw 1
Tuesday, December 10, 7:00 pm

Draw 2
Wednesday, December 11, 9:00 am

Draw 3
Wednesday, December 11, 12:30 pm

Draw 4
Wednesday, December 11, 4:30 pm

Draw 5
Wednesday, December 11, 8:30 pm

Draw 6
Thursday, December 12, 9:00 am

Draw 7
Thursday, December 12, 12:30 pm

Draw 8
Thursday, December 12, 4:30 pm

Draw 9
Thursday, December 12, 8:30 pm

Draw 10
Friday, December 13, 9:00 am

Draw 11
Friday, December 13, 12:30 pm

Draw 12
Friday, December 13, 4:30 pm

Draw 13
Friday, December 13, 8:30 pm

Tiebreakers
Saturday, December 14, 9:30 am

Playoffs

Quarterfinals
Saturday, December 14, 5:00 pm

Semifinals
Saturday, December 14, 8:30 pm

Final
Sunday, December 15, 1:30 pm

Women

Teams
The teams are listed as follows:

Round-robin standings
Final round-robin standings

Round-robin results
All draw times are listed in Newfoundland Time (UTC−03:30).

Draw 1
Tuesday, December 10, 7:00 pm

Draw 2
Wednesday, December 11, 9:00 am

Draw 3
Wednesday, December 11, 12:30 pm

Draw 4
Wednesday, December 11, 4:30 pm

Draw 5
Wednesday, December 11, 8:30 pm

Draw 6
Thursday, December 12, 9:00 am

Draw 7
Thursday, December 12, 12:30 pm

Draw 8
Thursday, December 12, 4:30 pm

Draw 9
Thursday, December 12, 8:30 pm

Draw 10
Friday, December 13, 9:00 am

Draw 11
Friday, December 13, 12:30 pm

Draw 12
Friday, December 13, 4:30 pm

Tiebreakers
Friday, December 13, 8:30 pm

Playoffs

Quarterfinals
Saturday, December 14, 1:30 pm

Semifinals
Saturday, December 14, 8:30 pm

Final
Sunday, December 15, 5:30 pm

Notes

References

External links

2019
December 2019 sports events in Canada
2019 in Canadian curling
Curling in Newfoundland and Labrador
2019 in Newfoundland and Labrador
Conception Bay South